State Route 378 (SR 378) is an east–west route located entirely in the city of Birmingham in Jefferson County in north central Alabama. It is known as Finley Boulevard for its entire length.

Route description 
SR 378 is part of the old alignment of U.S. Route 78 (US 78) along the entire length of Finley Boulevard in the East Thomas neighborhood. It begins at a junction with the new alignment of US 78 (Arkadelphia Road) on the west side, and it ends at a junction with U.S. Route 31 (US 31).

History 
The SR 378 designation was established in 2016 when US 78 was re-routed onto an alignment that carries US 78 from downtown Birmingham westward on Third Avenue North and Third Avenue West (concurrent with U.S. Route 11 (US 11), then north on Arkadelphia Road. Formerly, US 78 ran concurrently with US 31 north from downtown along Carraway Boulevard, then turned west onto Finley Boulevard, and then north again on Arkadeplhia Road. The SR 378 designation replaces US 78 on Finley Boulevard.

Major Intersections

References

External links

378 
378 
U.S. Route 78